The Rex Hotel in Gallup, New Mexico, at 300 W. Sixty-sixth, was built in 1910.  It was listed on the National Register of Historic Places in 1988.

It is a stone commercial building at the corner of 3rd St. and 66th Avenue.  When listed, it was under threat of demolition.

References

		
National Register of Historic Places in McKinley County, New Mexico
Hotel buildings completed in 1910
Hotels in New Mexico